Goodenia armstrongiana is a species of flowering plant in the family Goodeniaceae and is native to northern Australia and New Guinea. It is an erect to low-lying herb with egg-shaped to narrow elliptic leaves, sometimes with small teeth on the edges, racemes of white or yellow flowers with leaf-like bracts at the base, and oval fruit.

Description

Taxonomy and naming
Goodenis armstrongiana was first formally described in 1854 by Willem Hendrik de Vriese in the journal Natuurkundige Verhandelingen van de Hollandsche Maatschappij der Wetenschappen te Haarlem. The specific epithet (armstrongiana) honours John Armstrong who collected the type material.

Distribution and habitat
This goodenia grows in woodland and savanna from Arnhem Land and the Victoria River district in the Northern Territory to north Queensland and New Guinea.

Conservation status
Goodenia armstrongiana is classified as of "least concern" under the Queensland Government Nature Conservation Act 1992 and the Northern Territory Government Territory Parks and Wildlife Conservation Act 1976.

References

armstrongiana
Flora of the Northern Territory
Flora of Queensland
Flora of New Guinea
Plants described in 1854
Taxa named by Willem Hendrik de Vriese